The 11th Central Politburo of the Chinese Communist Party was elected at the 1st Plenary Session of the 11th Central Committee on August 19, 1977, consisting of 23 members and 3 alternate members. There were additions to the membership in 1978 and 1979.  It served until 1982.  It was preceded by the 10th Politburo of the Chinese Communist Party.

Members (23)
Hua Guofeng, Chairman of the Party Central Committee until June 1981; elected Vice Chairman of the Party Central Committee in June 1981, member of the Politburo Standing Committee
Ye Jianying, Vice Chairman of the Party Central Committee and member of the Politburo Standing Committee
Deng Xiaoping, Vice Chairman of the Party Central Committee and member of the Politburo Standing Committee
Li Xiannian, Vice Chairman of the Party Central Committee and member of the Politburo Standing Committee
Wang Dongxing, Vice Chairman of the Party Central Committee and member of the Politburo Standing Committee (dismissed in February 1980)

Others in stroke order of surnames:
Wei Guoqing
Ulanhu
Fang Yi
Liu Bocheng
Xu Shiyou
Ji Dengkui (dismissed in February 1980)
Su Zhenhua (died in February 1979)
Li Desheng
Wu De (dismissed in February 1980)
Yu Qiuli
Zhang Tingfa
Chen Yonggui
Chen Xilian (dismissed in February 1980)
Geng Biao
Nie Rongzhen
Ni Zhifu
Xu Xiangqian
Peng Chong

Alternate members (3)
Chen Muhua
Zhao Ziyang (until September 1979)
Saifuddin Azizi

Members elected in December 1978 (4)
at the 3rd Plenary Session of the 11th Central Committee:
Chen Yun, elected at the same time Vice Chairman of the Party Central Committee and member of the Politburo Standing Committee
Deng Yingchao
Hu Yaobang, appointed Secretary-General of the Party Central Committee in December 1978; elected General Secretary of the Party Central Committee and member of the Politburo Standing Committee in February 1980; elected Chairman of the Party Central Committee in June 1981
Wang Zhen

Members elected in September 1979 (2)
at the 4th Plenary Session of the 11th Central Committee:
Zhao Ziyang, elected member of the Politburo Standing Committee in February 1980; elected Vice Chairman of the Party Central Committee in June 1981 (previously alternate member)
Peng Zhen

References

External links 
  Gazette of the 1st Session of the 11th CCP Central Committee

Politburo of the Chinese Communist Party
1977 in China